Bigger, Better, Faster, Stronger was a New Zealand science-based reality television series broadcast on TV3. Each episode saw the two hosts, James Coleman and Greg Page, work to produce a "new and improved" version of a household appliance or object. At the beginning of each episode, the hosts selected their team from a combined pool of five people, four of whom had skills that were of value to the project, and one of whom (the wildcard) did not. They then spent the remainder of the day in a shed producing the new device, before holding competitive tests the following morning. The tests were adjudicated by Kirsten Pederson.

Before the series aired, Coleman told news media that the episode in which he attempted to make a clothes drier from a lawnmower engine and an angle grinder was a near-disaster, as "The clothes ended up being distributed in specks of cotton around the laundry and the hooks flew off and embedded themselves around the set," but "Luckily, they didn't kill or blind anyone."  

The series was nominated for an Aotearoa Film & Television Award in 2011.

Episodes

See also
Similar television series
 Bang Goes the Theory
 Brainiac: Science Abuse
 Dude, What Would Happen?
 It's Effin' Science
 MythBusters
 Prototype This!
 Proving Ground
 The Re-Inventors
 Smash Lab
 Time Warp

References

External links
 

2011 New Zealand television series debuts
2011 New Zealand television series endings
English-language television shows
New Zealand reality television series
Television shows funded by NZ on Air
Three (TV channel) original programming